Hendri Susilo Pramono (born 5 July 1979) is an Indonesian former professional tennis player.

Born in Surakarta, Pramono reached a career high singles ranking of 657 while competing on the professional tour and was ranked as high as 399 in doubles. He spent his career on the ITF Futures circuit and won three doubles titles.
 
Pramono featured in seven Davis Cup ties for Indonesia, between 1999 and 2004, mostly as a doubles player.

A regular Southeast Asian Games competitor, Pramono won six medals for his country in tennis, which included a team gold in 2003. He has also represented Indonesia at the Southeast Asian Games in the sport of soft tennis, winning two medals in 2011. At the 2014 Asian Games he was a member of Indonesia's team in soft tennis.

Pramono now works as a coach and has served as Indonesia's Davis Cup captain.

See also
List of Indonesia Davis Cup team representatives

References

External links
 
 
 

1979 births
Living people
Indonesian male tennis players
Soft tennis players at the 2014 Asian Games
Asian Games competitors for Indonesia
Southeast Asian Games medalists in tennis
Southeast Asian Games gold medalists for Indonesia
Southeast Asian Games silver medalists for Indonesia
Southeast Asian Games bronze medalists for Indonesia
Competitors at the 1999 Southeast Asian Games
Competitors at the 2003 Southeast Asian Games
Competitors at the 2011 Southeast Asian Games
Southeast Asian Games medalists in soft tennis
20th-century Indonesian people
21st-century Indonesian people